Pierre Beaubien (August 13, 1796 – January 9, 1881) was a physician and political figure in Canada East.

He was born in Baie-du-Febvre in 1796 and studied at the Séminaire de Nicolet and the Petit Séminaire de Montréal. He went to France, where he studied at the Académie de Paris and later became a doctor in 1822. He worked in France, returned to Lower Canada in 1827 and received his license to practice medicine there the following year. He served as doctor to the Sulpicians, as well as the Hôpital Général and Hôtel-Dieu in Montreal. Beaubien served on the city council for Montreal. He was one of two members representing the city of Montreal in the Legislative Assembly of the Province of Canada from 1843 to 1844 and represented Chambly from 1848 to 1849. In 1849, he resigned to become medical superintendent at the Montreal prison; he served in that post until his death. Beaubien also taught at the Montreal School of Medicine and Surgery, becoming president of the school in the 1860s and served as public health officer for the city of Montreal.

He died in Outremont in 1881. His son Louis served in the House of Commons of Canada and the Legislative Assembly of Quebec.

Beaubien Street and Beaubien Metro Station are named after him.

See also 
List of presidents of the Saint-Jean-Baptiste Society of Montreal

External links

Beaubien-Casgrain family
1796 births
1881 deaths
Members of the Legislative Assembly of the Province of Canada from Canada East
Presidents of the Saint-Jean-Baptiste Society of Montreal
People from Centre-du-Québec